Veles is a city in the central part of North Macedonia on the Vardar river. The city of Veles is the seat of Veles Municipality. Veles is the sixth largest Macedonian city with a total population of 43,716 (census 2002). The largest cities in the proximity of Veles are: Skopje - the capital and the largest city of North Macedonia - 54 km in the northwest direction, Štip 43 km to the east, Sveti Nikole 34 km to the northeast, Prilep 79 km in the southwest direction, and Kavadarci and Negotino 43 km and 40 km respectively to the southeast. Veles is on the crossroad of important international road and rail lines. For all these reasons, Veles is considered to have a good geolocation within North Macedonia.

Names 
Throughout the history Veles had many names, out of which three are most important. Vilazora was initially the Paeonian city Bylazora from the period of early Classical Antiquity. The city's name was Βελισσός Velissos in Ancient Greek. Later in the history, as part of the Ottoman Empire it became a township (kaza) called Köprülü in the Üsküp sanjak (one of the administrative divisions of the Ottoman Empire). After the Ottoman rule, from 1929 to 1941, Veles was part of the Vardar Banovina of the Kingdom of Yugoslavia. After World War II, the city was known as Titov Veles after Yugoslavian president Josip Broz Tito, but the 'Titov' was removed in 1996.

In Albanian it is known as Qyprill, for the same reason as the Turkish variant.

History 

The area of present-day Veles has been inhabited for over a millennium. In antiquity, it was a Paionian city called Bylazora, and contained a substantial population of Thracians and possibly Illyrians. It was then part of the Byzantine Empire, and at times the First and Second Bulgarian Empire. It became part of the Kingdom of Serbia at the end of the 13th century, while during the Serbian Empire (1345–71) it was an estate of Jovan Oliver and subsequently the Mrnjavčević family until Ottoman annexation after the Battle of Rovine (1395). Before the Balkan Wars, it was a township (kaza) with the name Köprülü, part of the Sanjak of Üsküp.

During the Great Eastern Crisis, the local Bulgarian movement of the day was defeated when armed Bulgarian groups were repelled by the League of Prizren, an Albanian organisation opposing Bulgarian geopolitical aims in areas like Köprülü that contained an Albanian population. According to the statistics of Bulgarian ethnographer Vasil Kanchov from 1900, 19,700 inhabitants lived in Veles, 12,000 Bulgarian Exarchists, 6,600 Turks, 600 Romani and 500 Aromanians.

Some identify Veles with the Velitza of which Saint Clement of Ohrid was bishop.
 
The Annuario Pontificio identifies Veles instead with the Diocese of Bela, a suffragan of the Metropolitan Latin Archdiocese of Achrida (Ohrid) in Bulgaria, and lists it, as no longer a residential diocese, among the Latin titular bishoprics. It is probably in Bosnia and Hercegovina (modern Velika?).

Veles made international news in 2016 when it was revealed that a group of teenagers in the city were controlling over 100 websites producing fake news articles in support of U.S. presidential candidate Donald Trump, which were heavily publicised on the social media site Facebook.

Economy 

Throughout North Macedonia Veles is known as an industrial center and recently, as a leader in the implementing of IT in the local administration in North Macedonia.

Geography

Veles is a municipality of 55,000 residents.
The geographic location of the city of Veles makes it suitable for hiking and camping, especially at the west side of the city. One such location is the tranquil village Bogomila. Nearby there is the man made lake Mladost, which is known as the city's recreational centre.

Climate

Media 
Two TV stations operate in Veles - Channel 21 & Zdravkin - and many radio stations.

Sports 
Veles has many sports teams, the most popular of which are :
 FK Borec, football
 FK Gemidžii, football
 FK Prevalec, football
 RK Borec, handball
 BK Borec, wrestling
KK Unibasket, basketball

International relations

Twin towns – sister cities 
Veles (city) is twinned with three other Balkanic towns :
  Samobor (Croatia)
  Slobozia (Romania)
  Užice (Serbia)
  Sombor (Serbia)
  Niš (Serbia)
  Nowogard (Poland)
  Ráckeve (Hungary)

Other forms of partnership :
 Pula (Croatia) (Document of friendship and cultural cooperation in 2002)

Notable locals 
History, royalty and politics
 Metodi Aleksiev, revolutionary
 Jovan Babunski, Chetnik vojvoda
 Panko Brashnarov, revolutionary
 Ilija Dimovski, former member of the Assembly of North Macedonia
 Gheorghe Ghica, Prince of Moldavia
 Vasil Glavinov, revolutionary
 Igor Janusev, general secretary of VMRO-DPMNE, member of the Assembly of North Macedonia
 Alekso Martulkov, revolutionary
 Dimče Mirčev, WWII partisan
 Ivan Naumov, revolutionary
 Kole Nedelkovski, revolutionary
 Kazım Özalp, Turkish military office
 Faik Pasha, general of the Ottoman Army
 Lazar Petrović, Serbian general and adjutant of King Aleksandar Obrenović
 Jordan Popjordanov, revolutionary
 Rizo Rizov, revolutionary 
 Mile Pop Yordanov, revolutionary

Culture
Yordan Hadzhikonstantinov-Dzhinot, teacher and publicist
Zivko Prendzov, art graphic
Kočo Racin, writer
Svetozar Ristovski, film director
Bobby Stojanov Varga, painter
Rayko Zhinzifov, poet

Sports
Ezgjan Alioski, footballer 
Panče Kumbev, footballer
Safer Sali, Olympic wrestler

References

Sources and external links 
 Official website of Veles

 
Cities in North Macedonia